The Xiluo Guangfu Temple is a prominent Mazu temple in Xiluo Township, Yunlin County, Taiwan.

Name
Because of the courtyard house was constructed from the worshiper's donations, the temple was named Guangfu which means wide blessing.

History
The temple was built in 1644.

See also
 Qianliyan & Shunfeng'er
 Chaotian Temple, Beigang
 Gongfan Temple, Mailiao
 List of Mazu temples around the world
 List of temples in Taiwan
 Religion in Taiwan

References

1644 establishments in Taiwan
Religious buildings and structures completed in 1644
Mazu temples in Yunlin County